Mercedes Bresso (born 12 July 1944) is an Italian politician (Democratic Party) who served as Member of the European Parliament from 2014 until 2019.

Early life and career
Bresso was born in Sanremo, Province of Imperia, Liguria.  In 1969, she received her degree in Economics; since 1973, she is a university professor of economic institutions at the Politecnico di Torino (Faculty of Engineering).

Political career
From 1989 onwards, Bresso was a member of the provincial, regional and national party executives of the Democrats of the Left. 1995–2004, she was the President of the Turin Province, and, a Member of Regional Council (1985–1995) and of the Regional Executive (1994–1995) with responsibility for regional planning in Piedmont. She was a member of the Committee of the Regions and its Bureau 1998–2004. Between 2005 and 2010, she was President of the Piedmont region.

Since 2002, she is the Italian Vice-Chairperson of AICCRE; 2000–2004, she was Chairperson of the World Federation of United Cities, and, 2004–2005, founding Chairperson of the Organisation Cités et Gouvernements locaux Unis.

Between March 2005 and October 2008, she was President of the Union of European Federalists (UEF).

President of the Committee of Region, 2010–2012
In February 2010, Bresso was elected the first female president of the European Committee of the Regions. She stood down at the end of April 2010, after being defeated on her home turf of Piedmont in her country's regional elections. Shortly after, Claudio Burlando, the president of Liguria and a fellow member of Italy's centre-left Democratic Party, gave up his seat on the Committee of Regions so that Bresso could have it.

Member of the European Parliament, 2014–2019
Bresso became a Member of the European Parliament following the 2014 European elections. A member of the Progressive Alliance of Socialists and Democrats group, she served on the Committee on Regional Development and on the Committee on Constitutional Affairs, where she was her parliamentary group's coordinator. In November 2014, Bresso and Elmar Brok were appointed by the committee to explore the possibilities of the eurozone governance reform without any treaty change.

In addition to her committee assignments, Bresso was a member of the parliament's delegation for relations with Switzerland and Norway and to the EU-Iceland Joint Parliamentary Committee and the European Economic Area (EEA) Joint Parliamentary Committee. She chaired the European Parliament Intergroup on Rural, Mountainous and Remote Areas (RUMRA). She was also a member of the Intergroup on Integrity (Transparency, Anti-Corruption and Organized Crime).

Other activities
 European Movement International, Member of the Honorary Council

See also
 2004 European Parliament election in Italy

References

External links

Official website of Mercedes Bresso

1944 births
Living people
Presidents of Piedmont
Presidents of the Province of Turin
Radical Party (Italy) politicians
Democratic Party of the Left politicians
Democrats of the Left politicians
Democratic Party (Italy) MEPs
MEPs for Italy 2004–2009
MEPs for Italy 2014–2019
21st-century women MEPs for Italy
Democrats of the Left MEPs
Grand Officers of the Order of Merit of the Italian Republic
People from Sanremo
20th-century Italian women politicians
Presidents of the European Committee of the Regions